Abeïbara  is a small Saharan village and rural commune in the Abeïbara Cercle of the Kidal Region of north-eastern Mali. The commune has an area of approximately 8,320 square kilometers and contains 11 settlements. In the 2009 census it had a population of 4,585.

References

External links
.

Communes of Kidal Region